This is a list of notable central Italians.

Architects

Francesco Talenti (c. 1300 – aft. 1369), was an architect. He worked at Orvieto Cathedral in the 1320s, and succeeded Pisano at Florence Cathedral in c. 1343.
Filippo Brunelleschi (1377–1446), was an architect and polymathic genius, who, among other achievements, was the discoverer of linear perspective.
Michelozzo (1396–1472), was an architect and sculptor, notable in the development of Florentine Renaissance architecture.
Bernardo Rossellino (1409–1464), was an architect as well as a sculptor and carried out the building of the Palazzo Rucellai.
Giuliano da Sangallo (c. 1445 – 1516), an architect, engineer, and sculptor, was active in Florence, Rome, Naples and Milan.
Baccio Pontelli (c. 1450 – 1492), was an architect and sculptor. Pupil of Francesco di Giorgio.
Antonio da Sangallo the Elder (c. 1453 – 1534), Renaissance architect among whose works was San Biagio near Montepulciano.
Baccio D'Agnolo (1462–1543), was a "wood-carver, sculptor, and architect who exerted an important influence on the Renaissance architecture of Florence."
Antonio da Sangallo the Younger (1484–1546), was "one of the most distinguished architects... in the second quarter of 16th century."
Jacopo Sansovino (1486–1570), was an architect and sculptor, most famous for his works in Venice's Piazza San Marco, particularly his Biblioteca Marciana.
Giulio Romano (c. 1499 – 1546), architect, painter and decorator, whose real name was Giulio Pippi. "He was one of the major figures of the late Renaissance."
Galeazzo Alessi (1512–1572), was an important High Renaissance architect, best known for his work in Genoa and Milan.
Bernardo Buontalenti (c. 1531 – 1608), architect, engineer, designer, painter, and inventor. He was one of the great Renaissance polymaths.
Nicola Sabbatini (1574–1654), was an architect and engineer "who pioneered in theatrical perspective techniques."
Gherardo Silvani (1579–1675), was a Baroque architect of distinction. His main work is the church of San Gaetano in Florence.
Carlo Rainaldi (1611–1691), was one of the most important architects in Rome during the second half of the 17th century.
Domenico Martinelli (1650–1718), was an architect and painter. Among his best works is the palace of Prince Lichtenstein at Vienna.
Alessandro Specchi (1668–1729), "was an able civic designer who, among other works, began the delightful Scala di Spagna, Rome (Spanish Steps)."
Alessandro Galilei (1691–1737), was one of a number of gifted architects whose work moved away from Baroque towards Neoclassicism.
Nicola Salvi (1697–1751), was an architect. He is now remembered for his work at the Trevi Fountain, the last great baroque monument in Rome.
Ferdinando Fuga (1699–1782), was an architect. He is best known for his rebuilding of Santa Maria Maggiore in Rome.
Giuseppe Piermarini (1734–1808), was "the leading architect in Lombardy during the last quarter of the 18th century."
Louis Visconti (1791–1853), was an architect active in France. His most significant project was the design for Bonaparte's Tomb.
Enrico Marconi (January 1792 – 1863), was an architect. From 1822 to his death, he was active in Poland.
Antonio Corazzi (December 1792 – 1877), was one of the principal authors of the architecture of Warsaw in the first half of the 19th century.
Marcello Piacentini (1881–1960), was an architect. Son of Pio Piacentini, and principal architect in Rome during the Fascist regime.
Italo Gismondi (1887–1974), was an architect and archaeologist. He also created the plastic model of ancient Rome displayed in the Museum of Roman Civilization.
Pietro Belluschi (1899–1994), was an architect, civil engineer, and designer. He won the 1972 AIA Gold Medal.
Luigi Moretti (1907–1973), was an architect. His most notable work is the Watergate complex in Washington, D.C.
Pietro Porcinai (1910–1986), was an artist, furniture designer, architect, and landscape architect, who began his career as a garden designer in 1937.
Massimiliano Fuksas (born 1944), is an architect. Among his works may be cited the Twin Tower, Vienna (1999–01), and the FieraMilano complex, Milan (2002–05).

Chess players

Serafino Dubois (1817–1899), was the leading Italian chess player for most of the mid 1800s.
Antonio Sacconi (1895–1968), was a chess player. International Master (1951) and Italian Champion in 1935 and joint Champion in 1937.

Cinematography

Augusto Genina (1892–1957), was a director and writer, known for Bengasi, The Siege of the Alcazar, and Heaven over the Marshes.
Mario Camerini (1895–1981), was a director and writer, known for Ulysses, Una romantica avventura, and War and Peace.
Alessandro Blasetti (1900–1987), was a director and writer, known for The Iron Crown, Prima comunione, and Me, Me, Me... and the Others.
Aldo Fabrizi (1905–1990), was an actor and director. He is best remembered for his performance in the Rossellini film, Rome, Open City.
Roberto Rossellini (1906–1977), was the first neorealist film director to rise to international acclaim with the release of Rome, Open City.
Anna Magnani (1908–1973), was an actress who won an Oscar for her performance in the screen adaptation of Tennessee Williams' The Rose Tattoo.
Gillo Pontecorvo (1919–2006), was a film director. He is best remembered for The Battle of Algiers, regarded by many critics as a masterpiece.
Alberto Sordi (1920–2003), was an actor who depicted Italy's virtues and vices in more than 160 movies and contributed to making Italian comedy famous worldwide.
Carlo Lizzani (April 1922 – 2013), was a director and writer, known for The Hunchback of Rome, Bandits in Milan, and Celluloide.
Mauro Bolognini (June 1922 – 2001), was a prolific director admired, above all, for his elegant adaptations of literary works, made mostly in the 1960s and 1970s.
Giuseppe Rotunno (born 1923), cinematographer. He is known for his work on The Adventures of Baron Munchausen, Wolf, and Amarcord.
Gabriele Ferzetti (born 1925), is an actor, known for Once Upon a Time in the West, L'Avventura, and On Her Majesty's Secret Service.
Sergio Corbucci (1926–1990), was a director, known for The Great Silence, Navajo Joe, and Gli specialisti.
Lucio Fulci (1927–1996), also known as The Godfather of Gore, was a film director, screenwriter, and actor.
Sergio Leone (3 January 1929 – 1989), was one of the most important directors of his generation. He is mostly associated with the Spaghetti Western genre.
Elio Petri (29 January 1929 – 1982), was a writer and director, known for Investigation of a Citizen Above Suspicion, A Quiet Place in the Country, and The Assassin.
Silvana Mangano (April 1930 – 1989), was an actress. She is best known for her role in the film Bitter Rice.
Antonio Margheriti (September 1930 – 2002), was a director and writer, known for Yor, the Hunter from the Future, Cannibal Apocalypse, and Horror Castle.
Virna Lisi (born 1936), is an actress. In 1994, she won two awards: Cannes Film Festival award and César award.
Giuliano Gemma (1938–2013), was an actor. A Pistol for Ringo, The Return of Ringo, and Blood for a Silver Dollar are among his greatest successes.
Osvaldo Desideri (born 1939), is an art director. He won an Oscar for Best Art Direction and Set Decoration (with Cesari and Scarfiotti) for The Last Emperor.
Vittorio Storaro (born 1940), is a cinematographer who won Oscars for Apocalypse Now, Reds, and The Last Emperor.
Manlio Rocchetti (born 1943), is a makeup artist. He won an Oscar for Best Makeup (with Lynn Barber and Kevin Haney) for Driving Miss Daisy.
Isabella Rossellini (June 1952), actress and model. She is probably best known for her role as Dorothy Vallens in the 1986 David Lynch film Blue Velvet.
Roberto Benigni (October 1952), is an actor, director and producer best known for his 1997 Oscar-winning film Life Is Beautiful.
Nanni Moretti (born 1953), is a director, producer, screenwriter, and actor. Ecce Bombo is generally considered his masterpiece.
Margherita Buy (born 1962), is an actress, known for The Ignorant Fairies, The Caiman, and Days and Clouds.
Gabriele Muccino (born 1967), is a director and writer, known for The Pursuit of Happyness, Seven Pounds, and The Last Kiss.
Matteo Garrone (born 1968), is a writer and director, known for Gomorrah, Reality, and L'imbalsamatore.
Asia Argento (born 1975), is a director, writer and actress. She is the daughter of the famous horror director Dario Argento.

Economists

Pellegrino Rossi (1787–1848), was a law expert, economist, diplomat, active in Swiss, French, and Italian politics.
Franco Modigliani (1918–2003), was an economist. He won the 1985 Nobel Memorial Prize in Economic Sciences for his pioneering work in economic theory.
Mario Draghi (born 1947), is a banker and economist. In 2013 Forbes nominated Draghi 9th most powerful person in the world.

Engineers

Felice Matteucci (1808–1887), was a hydraulic engineer, co-inventor with Eugenio Barsanti, of the internal combustion engine.
Filippo Zappata (1894–1994), was an engineer and one of the most important designers of seaplanes.
Riccardo Morandi (1902–1989), was a civil engineer. One of his most famous executed projects is the bridge on Lake Maracaibo in Venezuela.

Engravers

Maso Finiguerra (1426–1464), was a goldsmith, engraver, and draftsman, known for his work in niello, and as "one of the first major Italian printmakers."
Stefano della Bella (1610–1664), was a printmaker noted for his engravings of military events, in the manner of Jacques Callot.
Francesco Bartolozzi (1727–1815), was an engraver in the service of George III of the United Kingdom.
Bartolomeo Pinelli (1771–1835), was a painter and engraver who illustrated the works of Virgil, amongst others and published albums of numerous classical subjects.

Explorers

Amerigo Vespucci (1454–1512), was an explorer for whom the Americas were named.
Orazio Antinori (1811–1882), was a zoologist and African explorer, born at Perugia.

Fashion designers

Guccio Gucci (1881–1953), was a fashion designer and founder of The House of Gucci.
Roberto Cavalli (born 1940), is a well-known fashion designer of modern luxury clothing.
Laura Biagiotti (born 1943), is a fashion designer affectionately known as the Queen of Cashmere.

Fashion models

Monica Bellucci (born 1964), is a model and actress.
Mariacarla Boscono (born 1980), is a model.
Ilary Blasi (born 1981), is a showgirl and model.
Vanessa Hessler (born 1988), is a model and actress.

Military figures

Castruccio Castracani (1281–1328), was a famous condottiero created duke of Lucca in 1327.
Niccolò Piccinino (1386–1444), condottiero, was a cavalryman who spent the most important years of his career in the service of Milan.
Federico da Montefeltro (1422–1482), learned Renaissance prince who was an outstanding military leader and a great patron of the arts.
Vitellozzo Vitelli (c. 1458 – 1502), was a famous military leader or condottiero from Città di Castello, Umbria.
Cesare Borgia (1475/76 – 1507), was a Cardinal, military leader, and Machiavellian politician. He was the son of Pope Alexander VI.
Francesco Ferruccio (1489–1530), was a military commander. He served in the Bande Nere in various parts of Italy, earning a reputation as a daring fighter.
Alexander Farnese, Duke of Parma (1545–1592), was a famous military commander who served Philip II and became governor-general of the Netherlands.
Ottavio Piccolomini (1599–1656), was duke of Amalfi and one of the most powerful people in Spain as well as a key player in the Thirty Years' War.
Pier Ruggero Piccio (1880–1965), a skilled war pilot, distinguished himself in World War I as a daring fighter pilot. He had a total of 24 victories.
Enrico Toti (1882–1916), was a cyclist, patriot and one of the greatest of Italy's war heroes.
Franco Lucchini (1917–1943), was a World War II fighter pilot with 26 individual victories and 52 shared.

Missionaries

Riccoldo da Monte di Croce (c. 1243 – 1320), was a Dominican missionary to the court of the Mongol Il-Khan ruler Arghun.
Matteo Ricci (1552–1610), was a Jesuit missionary and polymath who opened China to Roman Catholic evangelization.
Anthony Baldinucci (1665–1717), was a Jesuit missionary, popularized the image as he preached and created missions throughout Italy.
Teodorico Pedrini (1671–1746), was a priest, missionary, musician and composer in China.
Ippolito Desideri (1684–1733), was a Jesuit missionary, who visited Tibet in the early 18th century.

Musicians

Guido of Arezzo (c. 990 – 1050), was a "medieval music theorist whose principles served as a foundation for modern Western musical notation."
Antonio Squarcialupi (1416–1480), was an organist and composer. He was "the most famous Italian organist of his time."
Giovanni Animuccia (c. 1520 – 1571), was a composer. "Predecessor of Palestrina as maestro of the Vatican and regarded as extraordinarily fertile innovator."
Gioseffo Guami (1542–1611), was an organist and composer of motets, madrigals and canzonas representative of the Venetian school.
Emilio de' Cavalieri (c. 1550 – 1602), was a composer and polymath. He lived mainly at the Florentine court of the Medici, where he was Inspector General of Arts.
Giulio Caccini (1551–1618), a tenor, composer, and teacher was the most important member of the Camerata.
Jacopo Peri (1561–1633), was a composer and singer. He is "often known as the 'inventor' of opera."
Ottavio Rinuccini (1562–1621), was the first opera librettist, having produced the texts for Peri's Dafne and Euridice, as well as Monteverdi's L'Arianna.
Giovanni Francesco Anerio (c. 1567 – 1630), was an important composer and organist, brother of Felice Anerio.
Marco da Gagliano (1582–1643), was a celebrated composer. Gagliano's Dafne, to a text by Rinuccini, is a milestone in the early history of opera.
Gregorio Allegri (c. 1582 – 1652), was maestro di capella for Pope Urban VIII. He was seen as a successor to Palestrina.
Pietro Della Valle (1586–1652), composer, librettist, and theorist. Della Valle was also "a soldier, world traveler, and a passionate and articulate orientalist."
Stefano Landi (February 1587 – 1639), was an early Baroque composer whose large output includes operas, madrigals, arias, masses, and other sacred compositions.
Francesca Caccini (September 1587 – after 1641), known as La Cecchina, was a skilled composer, singer, and instrumentalist who served the Medici court in Florence.
Antonio Cesti (1623–1669), "composer who, with Francesco Cavalli, was one of the leading Italian composers of the 17th century."
Jean-Baptiste Lully (1632–1687), was a composer and founder of the French operatic tradition. His name originally was Giovanni Battista Lulli.
Alessandro Stradella (1639–1682), was one of the major composers of his era, writing some 30 stage works and 200 cantatas.
Benedetto Pamphili (1653–1730), was a cardinal, a patron of music in Rome and a librettist, especially important during Handel's first year there.
Giuseppe Ottavio Pitoni (1657–1743), composer and writer on music. He was "one of the best and most prolific composers of sacred music of his time."
Francesco Manfredini (1684–1762), was an important composer of the Baroque Era. He worked mainly in the cultural orbit of Bologna.
Francesco Geminiani (1687–1762), was a violinist and composer noted for his concertos and sonatas.
Domenico Zipoli (1688–1726), was a composer. He is best known for his Sonate d'intavolatura per organo e cimbalo (1716), his only published work.
Francesco Maria Veracini (1690–1768), was lauded as one of the great violin virtuosi of the late Baroque and is also known as a composer of operas.
Giovanni Battista Pergolesi (1710–1736), was a famous composer. His intermezzo, La serva padrona, became a model for Italian opera buffa.
Antonio Sacchini (1730–1786), was a composer active in London from 1772 to 1781. "He was one of the leading 18th-century composers of opera seria."
Luigi Boccherini (1743–1805), was "one of the great musicians of the classical era – so great that his contemporaries put him on an equal footing with Haydn."
Giuseppe Cambini (1746–1825), was certainly one of the most prolific composers of the late 18th century, with well over 700 compositions to his name.
Muzio Clementi (1752–1832), was a musical polymath and child prodigy. In his time, he was known as "the father of the piano."
Luigi Cherubini (1760–1842), composer and teacher. He was a dominant figure in French musical life for half a century.
Francesco Morlacchi (1784–1841), was a composer of sacred music and operas, born at Perugia.
Pietro Raimondi (1786–1853), was a composer and conductor. A pupil of Conservatorio della Pieta, Naples.
Nicola Vaccai (1790–1848), opera composer. He wrote Giulietta e Romeo in 1825, the libretto of which was adapted by Romani for Bellini's I Capuleti e i Montecchi.
Gioachino Rossini (1792–1868), was one of the greatest musical geniuses of all time. The Barber of Seville is probably the greatest comic opera ever written.
Fanny Tacchinardi Persiani (1812–1867), was one of the great sopranos of his age. Studied with her father, the tenor Nicola Tacchinardi.
Erminia Frezzolini (1818–1884), was a great artist, "considered by many the greatest soprano of the 19th century, Jenny Lind not excepted."
Marietta Alboni (1823–1894), was a singer, described in Grove's Dictionary as "the most celebrated contralto of the nineteenth century."
Giovanni Sgambati (1841–1914), was a pianist, composer, and child prodigy. "He was a leading figure in the late 19th-century resurgence of non-operatic music in Italy."
Alfredo Catalani (1854–1893), composer whose only well known work – La Wally was brought to non-operatic prominence through the hugely successful French thriller Diva.
Alessandro Moreschi (November 1858 – 1922), was a castrato singer. Known as "the angel of Rome" because of vocal purity.
Giacomo Puccini (December 1858 – 1924), was an opera composer. He ranks as one of the greatest opera composers of all time.
Pietro Mascagni (1863–1945), was an operatic composer. He is known for his opera Cavalleria rusticana, based on the tale by Giovanni Verga.
Ferruccio Busoni (1866–1924), was a pianist, composer, and polymath who attained fame as a pianist of brilliance and intellectual power.
Luisa Tetrazzini (1871–1940), was "the most famous coloratura soprano of her day." She made many concert tours, appearing in London for the last time in 1934.
Giuseppe De Luca (1876–1950), was an operatic baritone. His debut was at Piacenza in 1897, singing Valentin in Gounod's Faust.
Titta Ruffo (1877–1953), was a baritone, most famous for his role of Figaro in Rossini's opera The Barber of Seville.
Vittorio Gui (1885–1975), was a conductor and composer. He founded the Orchestra Stabile (1928), which led to the creation of the Maggio Musicale Fiorentino.
Ezio Pinza (1892–1957), was a singer. "In many respects the finest lyric bass of the twentieth century, and one of the most popular singers in history."
Mario Castelnuovo-Tedesco (1895–1968), "was one of the most prolific Italian composers of the first half of the twentieth century."
Mario Del Monaco (1915–1982), was a leading dramatic tenor for Italian operas in the 1940s and 1950s, most famous for Otello.
Franco Corelli (1921–2003), was a celebrated tenor. His strong, dark voice has made him a favourite in such roles as Don José, Radamès and Calaf.
Renata Tebaldi (1922–2004), was one of the greatest opera singers of all time – Arturo Toscanini, hard to please, said she had the "voice of an angel."
Riz Ortolani (1926–2014), was a film composer. His best known piece is probably More, the theme tune from Mondo cane, which was Oscar nominated for Best Song.
Ennio Morricone (1928–2020), was a composer, one of the most prolific film composers of all time. In 2007 Morricone won an Oscar for Lifetime Achievement after five previous nominations.
Sylvano Bussotti (born 1931), is a polymath of his age: composer, successful painter, set designer, stage, film, and opera director.
Riccardo Fogli (born 1947), is a singer. He was a winner in 1982 at Festival di Sanremo with Storie di tutti i giorni.
Francesco De Gregori (born 1951), commonly known in his native country as Il principe poeta (The Poet Prince), is a famous singer-songwriter.
Ryan Paris (born 1953), original name Fabio Roscioli, is a singer. His biggest success was the world-famous song Dolce Vita.
Dario Marianelli (June 1963), is a composer of piano, orchestral, and film music. He won both an Oscar and a Golden Globe for Atonement in 2008.
Eros Ramazzotti (October 1963), is a singer-songwriter. "An international superstar whose appeal spans not only Western Europe but also Latin America."
Jovanotti (born 1966), original name Lorenzo Cherubini, is a singer-songwriter and rapper.
Tiziano Ferro (born 1980), is a famous pop singer. He remains best known for his European hit Perdono and his Latin American hit Sere nere.

Painters

Pietro Cavallini (1259 – c. 1330), painter and mosaicist. He was a member of the ancient Roman family of the Cerroni.
Francesco Traini (fl. 1321 – 1345), painter and illuminator. "He was the most accomplished Pisan artist in the second quarter of the 14th century."
Filippo Lippi (c. 1406 – 1469), was a leading painter of the Renaissance. He painted religious subjects on altarpieces and in frescoes in various towns in Italy.
Antonio del Pollaiuolo (1429/33 – 1498), was a painter, sculptor, goldsmith, and engraver. Representative of the Florentine school of the late quattrocento.
Niccolò Alunno (1430–1502), was a painter of the Umbrian School, who was also active in The Marches.
Antoniazzo Romano (c. 1430 – c. 1510), was the most important local painter in Rome during the period when the city reemerged as a major power in Italy.
Luca Signorelli (c. 1445 – 1523), was one of the great painters during the Renaissance. His masterpiece is the fresco cycle in Orvieto Cathedral.
Sandro Botticelli (c. 1445 – 1510), creator of The Birth of Venus and Primavera, was one of the greatest painters of the Renaissance.
Pinturicchio (1454–1513), original name Bernardino di Betto, was a painter of the Umbrian school known for his frescoes in the Collegiate Church at Spello.
Filippino Lippi (c. 1457 – 1504), Renaissance painter of the Florentine school, who was the son of Filippo Lippi and the pupil of Botticelli.
Fra Bartolomeo (1472–1517), painter who was "a prominent exponent in early 16th-century Florence of the High Renaissance style."
Pontormo (1494–1557), "was the leading painter in mid-16th-century Florence and one of the most original and extraordinary of Mannerist artists."
Giorgio Vasari (1511–1574), was a painter and polymath from Arezzo. Author of The Lives of the Most Excellent Painters, Sculptors, and Architects.
Giovanni Baglione (1566–1643), was a painter, draughtsman and writer. He executed canvases and frescoes of religious and mythological subjects, and portraits.
Giuseppe Cesari (1568–1640), was a celebrated historical painter, sometimes called il Cavaliere d'Arpino.
Domenico Fetti (c. 1589 – 1623), was a painter. "His most characteristic works are of religious themes turned into scenes of everyday contemporary life."
Artemisia Gentileschi (1593 – c. 1656), was a painter. She specialized in paintings of strong heroines, especially from the Bible.
Pietro da Cortona (1596/7 – 1669), painter and architect, was one of the leading protagonists of the exuberant, high Baroque style.
Giovanna Garzoni (1600–1670), was a painter, best known for her studies of flowers, plants, and animals.
Francesco Furini (1603–1646), "was one of the leading Florentine painters of the first half of the 17th century."
Filippo Baldinucci (1624–1697), was a painter, art historian, and biographer. He wrote "the first dictionary of art terminology."
Carlo Maratta (1625–1713), was a leading painter of the Roman school under the influence of the counter-reformation.
Pompeo Batoni (1708–1787), was "the preeminent painter of 18th century Rome and in the 1780s probably the most famous artist in Europe."
Marcello Bacciarelli (1731–1818), court painter to King Stanisław August Poniatowski, was one of the most prolific artists in Warsaw during the late 18th century.
Vincenzo Camuccini (1771–1844), was a painter. Among his best-known works are Death of Caesar and Death of Virginia.
Francesco Podesti (1800–1895), was a painter and Member of the Accademia di San Luca.
Constantino Brumidi (1805–1880), painter whose lifework was the painting of portraits and frescoes for the Capitol in Washington, D.C.
Giovanni Fattori (1825–1908), perhaps the best of the Macchiaioli, was fond of battle scenes and landscapes populated by long-horned white cattle.
Telemaco Signorini (1835–1901), painter and graphic artist. He was a leader of the Macchiaioli.
Amedeo Modigliani (1884–1920), was an important painter of the early 1900s. His favorite subject was the single figure.
Alberto Burri (1915–1995), was a painter, collagist and designer, born at Città di Castello in Umbria.

Political figures

Marozia (c. 890 – 982), was a noblewoman famous for her family's influence on the papacy. She is presumably the basis for the legend of a female Pope Joan.
Ugolino della Gherardesca (c. 1220 – 1289), count of Donoratico, was a prominent player in Pisan and Tuscan politics in the 13th century.
Cola di Rienzo (c. 1313 – 1354), original name Nicola Di Lorenzo, was a famous political leader who tried to restore the greatness of ancient Rome.
Lorenzo de' Medici (1449–1492), also known as Lorenzo the Magnificent, was a leading statesman of the Renaissance.
Lucrezia Borgia (1480–1519), was a powerful noblewoman who made three political marriages and is popularly regarded as a femme fatale.
Filippo Strozzi the Younger (1489–1538), was a member of one of Florence's noblest families and one of the richest men of his time.
Catherine de' Medici (1519–1589), was a Machiavellian politician, wife of Henry II of France.
Ercole Consalvi (1757–1824), was appointed cardinal secretary of state by Pope Pius VII a first time in 1800 and a second time in 1814.
Terenzio, Count Mamiani della Rovere (1799–1885), was a statesman and writer, who worked for Italian unification.
Sidney Sonnino (1847–1922), was a conservative leader, foreign minister during World War I, and Italian representative at the Paris Peace Conference.
Giovanni Gronchi (1887–1978), was a Christian Democrat politician who served as president of Italy from 1955 to 1962.
Carlo Rosselli (1899–1937), was a politician, economist, and strong opponent of fascism.
Altiero Spinelli (1907–1986), was a politician, journalist, and founder, in 1943, of the European Federalist Movement.
Giulio Andreotti (1919–2013), also known as Divine Julius, was the ultimate insider of Italian political life. For half a century he was at the heart of power.
Carlo Azeglio Ciampi (born 1920), is a politician and banker who has been both Prime Minister of Italy and President of the Italian Republic.
Franco Frattini (born 1957), is a politician. Former Italian Minister of Foreign Affairs and former European Commissioner.

Popes

Pope John XIII (c. 930/35 – 972), original name Giovanni dei Crescenzi, was pope from 965 to 972.
Pope John XIX (... – 1032), original name Romano dei Conti di Tuscolo, was pope from 1024 to 1032.
Pope Innocent II (... – 1143), original name Gregorio Papareschi, was pope from 1130 to 1143.
Pope Eugene III (... – 1153), original name Bernardo da Pisa, was pope from 1145 to 1153.
Pope Anastasius IV (c. 1073 – 1154), original name Corrado Di Suburra, was pope from July 1153 to December 1154.
Pope Lucius III (c. 1100 – 1185), original name Ubaldo Allucingoli, was pope from 1181 to 1185.
Pope Celestine II (1100/05 – 1144), original name Guido di Castello, was pope from 1143 to 1144.
Pope Honorius III (1148–1227), original name Cencio Savelli, was pope from 1216 to 1227.
Pope Innocent III (1160/61 – 1216), original name Lotario dei Conti di Segni, was pope from 1198 to 1216.
Pope Gregory IX (before 1170 – 1241), original name Ugolino di Conti, was pope from 1227 to 1241.
Pope Alexander IV (1199–1261), original name Rinaldo Conti, Count of Segni, was pope from 1254 to 1261.
Pope Honorius IV (c. 1210 – 1287), original name Giacomo Savelli, was pope from 1285 to 1287.
Pope Nicholas III (c. 1225 – 1280), original name Giovanni Gaetano Orsini, was pope from 1277 to 1280.
Pope Nicholas IV (1227–1292), original name Girolamo Masci, was pope from 1288 to 1292.
Pope Boniface VIII (c. 1235 – 1303), original name Benedetto Caetani, was pope from 1294 to 1303.
Pope Martin V (1369–1431), original name Otto or Oddone Colonna, was pope from 1417 to 1431.
Pope Leo X (1475–1521), original name Giovanni de' Medici, was pope from 1513 to 1521.
Pope Clement VII (1478–1534), original name Giulio di Giuliano de' Medici, was pope from 1523 to 1534.
Pope Julius III (1487–1555), original name Giovanni Maria Ciocchi del Monte, was pope from 1550 to 1555.
Pope Leo XI (1535–1605), original name Alessandro Ottaviano de' Medici, was pope from 1–27 April 1605.
Pope Clement VIII (1536–1605), original name Ippolito Aldobrandini, was pope from 1592 to 1605.
Pope Paul V (1552–1621), original name Camillo Borghese, was pope from 1605 to 1621.
Pope Urban VIII (1568–1644), original name Maffeo Barberini, was pope from 1623 to 1644.
Pope Innocent X (1574–1655), original name Giovanni Battista Pamphilj, was pope from September 1644 to January 1655.
Pope Clement X (1590–1676), original name Emilio Bonaventura Altieri, was pope from 1670 to 1676.
Pope Clement IX (1600–1669), original name Giulio Rospigliosi, was pope from 1667 to 1669.
Pope Clement XII (1652–1740), original name Lorenzo Corsini, was pope from 1730 to 1740.
Pope Pius XII (1876–1958), original name Eugenio Maria Giuseppe Giovanni Pacelli, was pope from 1939 to 1958.

Printers

Pietro Perna (1519–1582), was one of the most important printers of Basel.

Saints

John Gualbert (985 or 995 – 1073), was a Christian monk, reformer, and founder of the Vallumbrosan Order.
Bona of Pisa (c. 1156 – 1207), was a nun. She is the patron saint of travellers, flight attendants, and Pisa.
Francis of Assisi (1181/2 – 1226), original name Giovanni di Pietro di Bernardone, was the founder of the Franciscans.
Clare of Assisi (1194–1253), original name Chiara Offreduccio, was an abbess and founder of the Poor Clares.
Agnes of Assisi (1197/8 – 1253), was an abbess and miracle worker, the younger sister of Saint Clare of Assisi.
Philip Benizi de Damiani (1233–1285), also known as St Philip Benitius, was a general superior of the Order of the Servites.
Angela of Foligno (1248–1309), was a mystic born in Foligno, Umbria, author of The Book of the Experiences of the Truly Faithful.
Juliana Falconieri (1270–1341), was the foundress of the Servite Nuns, called the Mantellates.
Andrew Corsini (1302–1373), was a Carmelite bishop of Fiesole, who had been canonized in 1629.
Frances of Rome (1384–1440), was a mystic. In 1425 she founded the Oblates of Mary, who were later called the Oblates of Tor de' Specchi.
Philip Neri (1515–1595), was a priest, founder of the Congregation of the Oratory (Oratorians).
Catherine of Ricci (1522–1590), original name Alessandra Lucrezia Romola de' Ricci, was a Dominican mystic and stigmatist.
Magdalena de Pazzi (1566–1607), was a Carmelite nun known for her austerity and her ecstatic visions during which she exhibited the stigmata.
Vincent Strambi (1745–1824), was a member of the Passionist Order, Bishop of Macerata and Tolentino.
Teresa Margaret of the Sacred Heart (1747–1770), original name Anna Maria Redi, was a Discalced Carmelite nun and mystic.
Gaspar del Bufalo (1786–1837), was a priest who founded the Missionaries of the Precious Blood in 1815.
Vincent Pallotti (1795–1850), was a priest and founder of the Society of the Catholic Apostolate.
Gabriel of Our Lady of Sorrows (1838–1862), original name Francesco Possenti, was a Passionist clerical student.

Scientists

Paolo dal Pozzo Toscanelli (1397–1482), was a physician, mapmaker, and astrologer who suggested to Christopher Columbus that he could reach Asia by sailing westward.
Vidus Vidius (1509–1569), was a surgeon and anatomist. Vidus' name is associated with several anatomical structures: the Vidian nerve and Vidian artery.
Hippolito Salviani (1514–1572), was a physician, scholar, and naturalist. His magnificent Aquatilium animalium historiae was first printed in 1554.
Andrea Cesalpino (1519–1603), an anatomist and botanist, was the first to develop a model of blood circulation (of the inner circle) and a classification of plants and minerals.
Castore Durante (1529–1590), was a physician, botanist, and poet. In his Herbario Nuovo (1585) he combined his talents and wrote the plant descriptions in verse.
Michele Mercati (1541–1593), physician to Pope Clement VII in Rome and supervisor of the Vatican botanic gardens, was also interested in geography, geology, and chorology.
Galileo Galilei (1564–1642), a physicist and polymathic genius, has been called the "father of modern science."
Federico Cesi (1585–1630), was a scientist, naturalist, and founder of the Accademia dei Lincei.
Francesco Redi (1626–1697), was a biologist and poet who in 1668 succeeded to experimentally refute the hypothesis of spontaneous generation.
Pietro Rossi (1738–1804), was an academic, naturalist, and author. First Professor of Entomology (University of Pisa, 1801–1804).
Paolo Mascagni (1755–1815), was a famous anatomist and professor at the universities of Pisa and Florence.
Vincenzo Chiarugi (1759–1820), was a physician, author of the first Italian treatise on psychiatry, Della pazzia in genere e in specie (1793).
Giuseppe Raddi (1770–1829), was a cryptogamist, traveler, explorer, plant collector (Brazil, Madeira, and Egypt), mycologist. He wrote Synopsis filicum brasiliensium (1819).
Paolo Savi (1798–1871), was a geologist, ornithologist, and professor of natural history at the University of Pisa.
Filippo Civinini (1805–1844), was an anatomist. In 1835 Civinini provided the first description of plantar neuroma, known today as Morton's metatarsalgia.
Antonio Meucci (1808–1889), was a scientist and inventor. In almost every major reference publication in Italy, Meucci is recognized as the inventor of the telephone.
Filippo Pacini (1812–1883), a physician who was "particularly skilled in microscopy, observed the comma-shaped bacillus that causes cholera. He called it a vibrio."
Giovanni Arcangeli (1840–1921), was a botanist. The plant genus Arcangelisia from the family Menispermaceae is named in his honor.
Antonio Pacinotti (1841–1912), was a physicist and electrical engineer. In 1858 Pacinotti built the first dynamo and in 1860 the first direct current electric engine.
Odoardo Beccari (1843–1920), was an eminent botanist. Beccari discovered one of the most amazing plants, which the evolution brought out: Amorphophallus titanum.
Leonardo Gigli (1863–1908), was a surgeon and gynecologist who, in 1894, invented the flexible wire saw named for him for the performance of pubiotomy.
Ruggero Oddi (1864–1913), was a physiologist and anatomist. The sphincter of Oddi in the major duodenal papilla is named after him.
Adelchi Negri (1876–1912), professor at Pavia, discovered in 1903 the Negri bodies in the brain of rabid animals, a discovery of great value in the diagnosis of rabies.
Bruno Pontecorvo (1913–1993), scientist and university professor. He was formed as a physicist in the famous school of Enrico Fermi at the University of Rome.
Margherita Hack (1922–2013), also known as Lady of the Stars, was an astrophysicist and popular science writer.
Bruno Zumino (born 1923), is a theoretical physicist noted as the co-inventor of the Wess–Zumino model and Wess–Zumino–Witten model in the field of supersymmetry.
Paolo Maffei (1926–2009), was a professional astronomer who has discovered two galaxies. These soon became known as Maffei 1 and 2.
Giovanni Jona-Lasinio (born 1932), is a physicist, famous for having constructed "the first model in elementary particle physics with spontaneous symmetry breaking."
Nicola Cabibbo (1935–2010), was a physicist. His legacy in particle physics is recorded in the Cabibbo–Kobayashi–Maskawa matrix and the Cabibbo angle.
Franco Pacini (1939–2012), was an astrophysicist, member of the ESO council and director of the Arcetri Observatory in Florence.
Giorgio Parisi (born 1948), is a physicist. In theoretical particle physics his name is mostly associated to the famous DGLAP equations.
Federico Capasso (born 1949), is a physicist. He was one of the inventors of the quantum cascade laser.

Mathematicians

Fibonacci (c. 1170 – c. 1250), also known as Leonardo of Pisa, was the most distinguished mathematician of the Middle Ages.
Ostilio Ricci (1540–1603), was a mathematician and a professor at the Accademia delle Arti del Disegno in Florence.
Guidobaldo del Monte (1545–1607), was a mathematician, engineer, wealthy aristocrat, and Galileo's patron.
Vincenzo Viviani (1622–1703), was one of the mathematicians who succeeded in determining the tangent to the cycloid.
Vittorio Fossombroni (1754–1844), was a celebrated mathematician, statesman, and famous expert in hydraulics.
Guglielmo Libri Carucci dalla Sommaja (1803–1869), was a mathematician who worked on mathematical physics, particularly the theory of heat.
Baldassarre Boncompagni (1821–1894), was "a writer and scholar on the history of mathematics who accumulated a vast library of over 40,000 works."
Enrico Betti (1823–1892), was a mathematician. He developed the Betti numbers, which extend the Euler characteristic to higher-dimensional shapes.
Francesco Siacci (1839–1907), was a mathematician and ballistician. He is best known for his contributions to the field of exterior ballistics.
Ulisse Dini (1845–1918), mathematician whose most important work was on the theory of functions of real variables.
Giovanni Frattini (1852–1925), was a mathematician. He is known for the famous Frattini subgroup.
Vito Volterra (1860–1940), was a mathematician whose most important work was in the area of integral (whole–number) equations.
Federigo Enriques (1871–1946), is known among mathematicians for his contributions to the theory of algebraic surfaces and, in particular, to their classification.
Carlo Severini (1872–1951), was a mathematician. Severini, independently from Dmitri Egorov, proved and published earlier the theorem now known as Egorov's theorem.
Francesco Severi (1879–1961), one of Italy's most renowned mathematicians, was born in Arezzo.
Antonio Signorini (1888–1963), was a mathematical physicist and civil engineer. He is known for his work in finite elasticity and for formulating the Signorini problem.
Enzo Martinelli (1911–1999), was a mathematician who co-discovering the Bochner–Martinelli formula.
Aldo Andreotti (1924–1980), was a mathematician who proved the Andreotti–Frankel theorem and the Andreotti–Grauert theorem and the Andreotti–Vesentini theorem.

Sculptors

Guglielmo Agnelli (c. 1238 – 1313), was a sculptor and architect, pupil of Nicola Pisano.
Giovanni Pisano (c. 1250 – c. 1315), was a sculptor, sometimes called "the only true Gothic sculptor in Italy."
Lorenzo Ghiberti (1378–1455), was a sculptor and goldsmith; a major transitional figure between the late Gothic and Renaissance worlds.
Nanni di Banco (c. 1384 – 1421), was an influential sculptor whose masterpiece is the marble Four Crowned Martyrs.
Donatello (c. 1386 – 1466), was a great sculptor. His bronze David from the 1430s shows the influence of classical Greek sculpture on his own style.
Luca della Robbia (1399/1400 – 1482), uncle of Andrea della Robbia, was the first major Renaissance artist to use ceramics for sculpture.
Agostino di Duccio (1418 – c. 1481), was a sculptor, noted for his carved marble panels in the interior of the Tempio Malatestiano at Rimini.
Antonio Rossellino (1427–1479), was a sculptor, brother of the architect Bernardo.
Andrea della Robbia (1435–1525), nephew of Luca della Robbia, was a ceramic artist and sculptor.
Matteo Civitali (1436–1502), sculptor, medalist, and architect, an associate of Antonio Rossellino, at whose studio in Florence he was trained.
Benedetto da Maiano (1442–1497), was a leading Florentine sculptor and architect of the early Renaissance.
Andrea Ferrucci (1465–1526), known also as Andrea di Piero Ferruzzi, was a sculptor who was born in Fiesole.
Pietro Torrigiano (1472–1528), was a sculptor who worked in England, notably on the tomb of Henry VII.
Benedetto Grazzini (1474 – c. 1552), known also as Benedetto da Rovezzano, was a sculptor and architect from Pistoia.
Giovanni Francesco Rustici (1475–1554), was a sculptor and painter of the Renaissance.
Lorenzetto (1490–1541), original name Lorenzo Lotti, was a sculptor and architect from Florence.
Bartolommeo Bandinelli (1493–1560), was a Renaissance sculptor. Hercules and Cacus is generally considered his masterpiece.
Benvenuto Cellini (1500–1571), was a famous goldsmith and sculptor. He was also the author of the celebrated Autobiography.
Giovanni Angelo Montorsoli (c. 1506 – 1563), was a celebrated sculptor and architect from Florence, a pupil of Michelangelo.
Vincenzo Danti (1530–1576), "sculptor, architect, and writer, active for most of his short career in Florence, where he was based from 1557 to 1573."
Taddeo Landini (c. 1561 – 1596), was a sculptor and architect, best known as author of the Fontana delle Tartarughe in Rome.
Pietro Tacca (1577–1640), was a pupil of Giambologna, who later became the official sculptor to the Medici.
Giuliano Finelli (1601–1653), was a sculptor of the Baroque period, pupil of Bernini.
Domenico Guidi (1625–1701), was a sculptor, nephew and pupil of Finelli.
Giovanni Battista Foggini (1652–1725), was among the foremost sculptors of the late Baroque period in Tuscany.
Giovanni Baratta (1670–1747), was a distinguished sculptor of the Florentine late Baroque.
Pietro Bracci (1700–1773), was "the most prolific sculptor in eighteenth-century Rome," a pupil of Camillo Rusconi.
Giuseppe Ceracchi (1751–1801), was an influential sculptor. According to Thomas Jefferson, he was "unquestionably an artist of the first class."
Clemente Susini (1754–1814), was a sculptor who became famous for his anatomical wax models of the human body.
Marino Marini (1901–1980), was a sculptor. He is best known for his many vigorous sculptures of horses and horsemen.

Writers and philosophers

Brunetto Latini (c. 1220 – 1294), was a writer, author of a prose encyclopedia in French, Li Livres dou Trésor and of Tesoretto, a didactic poem in a popular style in Italian.
Giles of Rome (c. 1243 – 1316), philosopher, theologian, and Augustinian Hermit. He was a member of the influential Colonna family.
Dino Compagni (c. 1255 – 1324), was a public official and historian, author of a valuable history of Florence Cronica delle cose occorrenti ne' tempi suoi (published 1726).
Dante Alighieri (c. 1265 – 1321), was an author and polymathic genius. Many scholars consider The Divine Comedy a summary of medieval thought.
Cino da Pistoia (1270 – 1336/37), a poet and jurist, whose full name was Guittoncino dei Sinibaldi.
Giovanni Villani (c. 1276 or 1280 – 1348), was a historian, official and diplomat, and author of the Nuova Cronica.
Petrarch (1304–1374), was a great lyric poet and scholar. He wrote more than 400 poems in Italian. Of these, 366 form his Canzoniere, on which his reputation rests.
Franco Sacchetti (c. 1335 – c. 1400), was a writer and statesman who is best known for his collection of stories, the Trecentonovelle.
Leonardo Bruni (c. 1370 – 1444), was a humanist, historian and philosopher, known for his work Historiarum Florentini populi libri XII (1415).
Giannozzo Manetti (1396–1459), scholar, statesman, writer, and translator. He was "one of the more considerable personalities of the age."
Matteo Palmieri (1406–1475), was a humanist and historian who is best known for his work Della vita civile ("On Civic Life").
Luigi Pulci (1432–1484), was a poet, author of the burlesque epic in Tuscan dialect Morgante or Morgante Maggiore.
Niccolò Machiavelli (1469–1527), was a writer and polymathic genius whom many people consider the father of modern political science.
Francesco Guicciardini (1483–1540), was a statesman, diplomat and historian, author of History of Italy (completed in 1540, published 1561–1564).
Pietro Aretino (1492–1556), was a poet, prose writer, and dramatist. His masterpiece Orazia (1546) was perhaps the best Italian tragedy of the 16th century.
Agnolo Firenzuola (1493–1543), was a writer and poet, known for his work I ragionamenti d'amore (Tales of Firenzuola, 1548).
Luigi Alamanni (1495–1556), was a poet and statesman. He wrote plays and lively letters to his friends and introduced the epigram into modern Italian poetry.
Piero Vettori (1499–1585), also known as Pietro Vittorio, was a writer, philologist, and scholar.
Benedetto Varchi (1502/3 – 1565), was a scholar and critic, best known for his 16-volume history of Florence.
Giovanni della Casa (1503–1556), was an ecclesiastical careerist, writer and poet, known for his work Il Galateo.
Girolamo Mei (1519–1594), was a humanist, editor of Greek texts, and historian of Greek music.
Cesare Ripa (c. 1560 – c. 1645), was a writer and illustrator. Author of Iconologia (1593), an influential and often reprinted handbook of emblems for artists.
Lorenzo Magalotti (1637–1712), was a "philosopher, scientist, author, diplomat, and poet."
Giovanni Mario Crescimbeni (1663–1728), priest, poet, and critic, was a founder-member of the Accademia degli Arcadi.
Metastasio (1698–1782), writer and musical genius. He was probably the single most influential figure in the history of eighteenth-century opera.
Giuseppe Gioachino Belli (1791–1863), was a great poet and profound thinker. His poetic production "consists of about 2,000 sonnets written in the Roman dialect."
Giacomo Leopardi (1798–1837), was a poet. This tormented genius is revealed in his work to have been a precursor of modern existentialist thought.
Francesco Domenico Guerrazzi (1804–1873), was a writer – storyteller, essayist, dramatist, and polemicist – as well as a patriot.
Carlo Collodi (1826–1890), an author, wrote the famous children's story The Adventures of Pinocchio.
Giosuè Carducci (1835–1907), a poet, scholar, and literary critic, won the 1906 Nobel Prize for literature.
Rafael Sabatini (1875–1950), was a writer of novels of romance and adventure. He remains best known for The Sea Hawk, Captain Blood, and Scaramouche.
Giovanni Papini (1881–1956), was a well-known writer, poet, critic, and a pioneer of the modern literary form of fiction as "fact."
Aldo Palazzeschi (1885–1974), original name Aldo Giurlani, was a poet and novelist from Florence.
Sandro Penna (1906–1977), was a poet of great charm, whose main theme is his homosexuality, which he makes no attempt to disguise.
Alberto Moravia (1907–1990), was one of the greatest novelists and short-story writers of the 1900s. Moravia wrote more than 30 books.
Eugenio Garin (1909–2004), a leading historian of Italian philosophy, had a powerful imprint on the many scholars who studied with him.
Fosco Maraini (1912–2004), was a writer and polymath whose book Secret Tibet was the first modern account of the remote Himalayan kingdom on "the roof of the world."
Vasco Pratolini (1913–1991), was a neorealist writer whose novels had a strong local setting.
Carlo Cassola (1917–1987), was a novelist and short-story writer. In 1960 Cassola won the Strega Prize for La ragazza di Bube (Bebo's Girl; film, 1964).
Luciano Bianciardi (1922–1971), was a writer. During his lifetime, he distinguished himself as a novelist, journalist, prolific translator, and pamphleteer.
Oriana Fallaci (1929–2006), was a journalist, writer, and former war correspondent best known for her abrasive interviews and provocative stances.
Dacia Maraini (born 1936), is a famous novelist, dramatist, poet, children's writer, and leading feminist commentator.
Tiziano Terzani (1938–2004), was a journalist and writer who mourned the corruption of Asia by the materialistic west.
Giorgio Agamben (born 1942), is a philosopher best known for his concept of homo sacer.
Antonio Tabucchi (1943–2012), was a writer and academic with a deep love of the culture and language of Portugal.
Andrea Riccardi (born 1950), is a Catholic historian. In 1968 in Rome, he founded the Community of Sant'Egidio.

Other notables

Beatrice Portinari (1266–1290), of Florence, believed to be Beatrice of the Divine Comedy and Vita nuova, was Dante's lifelong inspiration.
Baldus de Ubaldis (1327–1400), was a famous medieval jurist who taught law at Pisa, Perugia, and Padua.
Francesco di Marco Datini (c. 1335 – 1410), was a wool merchant and banker of Prato in Tuscany.
Lisa del Giocondo (1479–1542), also known as Lisa Gherardini, was the subject of the Mona Lisa, painted by Leonardo da Vinci.
Peter Martyr Vermigli (1499–1562), was "one of the most influential theologians of the era, held in common regard with such figures as Martin Luther and John Calvin."
Ignazio Danti (1536–1586), a versatile Dominican friar who was a mathematician, astronomer, mapmaker, artist, and university professor.
Giacomo Torelli (1608–1678), was a "stage designer and engineer whose innovative theatre machinery provided the basis for many modern stage devices."
Decio Azzolino (1623–1689), was a Cardinal. Head of the Sacro Collegio faction, known as the Squadrone Volante.
Antonio Magliabechi (1633–1714), was a librarian for the Medici grand dukes, polymath, and passionate book collector.
Philippe Buonarroti (1761–1837), was a disciple of Babeuf, prominent figure in French Revolution of 1789.
Leonetto Cappiello (1875–1942), was one of the most prolific poster artists during both the Art Nouveau and Art Deco periods in Paris.
Luisa Spagnoli (1877–1935), was a businesswoman. She is especially known for the invention of Bacio Perugina and her fashion house.
Ferdinando Innocenti (1891–1966), businessman. He was the founder of the Innocenti company and was the creator of the Lambretta motorscooter.
Luigi Serafini (born 1949), is an artist. He is famous for his works unusual and vague, such as the Codex Seraphinianus.
Umberto Guidoni (born 1954), is an astronaut and a veteran of two NASA Space Shuttle missions.
Augusto Odone, (1933-2013) inventor of Lorenzo's oil, a treatment for Adrenoleukodystrophy.

See also

List of southern Italians

Footnotes

References

Lists of Italian people
Central Italy